Sharps Creek is a tributary of the Row River in Lane County, in the U.S. state of Oregon. It begins near Bohemia Mountain and the Calapooia Divide of the Cascade Range and flows generally northwest to meet the river. Much of its course lies within the Umpqua National Forest.

According to Oregon Geographic Names, Sharps Creek was named for James H. "Bohemia" Sharp, a local prospector and road builder. The "Bohemia" in Sharp's nickname stemmed from another miner, James Johnson, who in 1863 found lode gold deposits on the mountain. Earlier prospectors had found placer gold in the creek in 1858. Johnson was nicknamed "Bohemia" because he had grown up in Bohemia in eastern Europe. He and other miners organized the Bohemia Gold and Silver Mining District (later referred to as the Bohemia mining district) in 1867.

The Sharps Creek Recreation Site, overseen by the Bureau of Land Management, is along the creek  from Cottage Grove. Open usually from mid-May through the end of September, it has a day use area, 11 campsites, potable water, toilets, picnic tables and fire rings, and a swimming hole. Recreational activities near the site include fishing, hiking, wildlife viewing, and gold panning.

Tributaries
Named tributaries listed from source to mouth include Bohemia Creek, which enters from the right; Judson Rock Creek, right; Fairview Creek, right; Sailors Gulch, left; Martin Creek, left, and White Creek, right. Also, Walker Creek, left; Buck Creek, left; Lick Creek, right; Staples Creek, right; Pony Creek, right; Table Creek, left; Damewood Creek, left, and Boulder Creek, left.

See also
List of rivers of Oregon

References

Rivers of Lane County, Oregon
Rivers of Oregon